Winifred Waddell, MBE, (8 October 1884, Cumberland, England – 1972) was an English-born Australian botanist.

Waddell taught mathematics in Melbourne before she retired. She worked with native-plant preservation groups during the 1950s. "In all weathers you will find Miss Waddell peering round In odd places, on a disused railway line, in the middle of a racecourse, on the edge of an old gold mine in a lovely valley or in a creek bank for 'survivals'", noted one newspaper profile in 1954.  She was responsible for securing the first wildflower sanctuary, at Tallarook, Victoria, in 1949. She was appointed MBE on 1 January 1964 for her work in preservation of natural flora.

References

External links
Women of Australia
Archival/Heritage Resources Published Resources

1884 births
1972 deaths
20th-century Australian botanists
English botanists
Members of the Order of the British Empire
People from Cumberland
People from Victoria (Australia)
Australian conservationists
British emigrants to Australia